The William R. Snodgrass Tennessee Tower (also known as the Tennessee Tower) is a skyscraper in downtown Nashville, Tennessee, that houses Tennessee government offices. The tower was built for the National Life and Accident Insurance Company and served as its National Life Center until the State of Tennessee acquired it on January 3, 1994. More than 1,000 state employees who had been assigned to numerous locations now work in the building.

Although surpassed by the Fifth Third Center as the tallest building in Nashville, its roof remains the highest point in the city because the tower is on a hill.

The building is named in honor of William R. Snodgrass, a career public servant who served as Tennessee's Comptroller of the Treasury from 1955 to 1999.

The tower was struck by lightning on August 31, 2003, which caused a firepump to turn on the sprinkler system.  This caused flooding and extensive damage to the elevator shafts.

Prior to being purchased by the state, the building was used to display messages by turning on lights in the windows on the front of the building.  After being dormant for 10 years a new message – "Peace" – was displayed on December 17, 2007.

See also
List of tallest buildings in Nashville

References

External links

 Listing at Emporis.com

Skyscraper office buildings in Nashville, Tennessee

Skidmore, Owings & Merrill buildings
International style architecture in Tennessee
Office buildings completed in 1970